Tolle may refer to:

Eckhart Tolle (born 1948), writer and public speaker.
Jim Tolle, Senior Pastor of The Church on the Way in California
Porto Tolle, a town in the province of Rovigo, Veneto, Italy